The NRE 1GS7B is a low-emissions diesel switcher locomotive built by National Railway Equipment. There have been nine 1GS7B locomotives produced to date, manufactured at NREC's Mount Vernon shops in Southern Illinois, and at NREC's Dixmoor shops. It's also the only current single-engine switcher marketed in NRE's N-ViroMotive catalog.

Original Buyers

See also
 List of NRE locomotives
 List of GM-EMD locomotives

References

External links
 National Railway Equipment – Official NRE Website
 National Railway Equipment  – Official N-ViroMotive Product Page
  – 1GS7B Photographs

B-B locomotives
NRE locomotives
Railway locomotives introduced in 2008
Diesel-electric locomotives of the United States
EPA Tier 2-compliant locomotives of the United States
Rebuilt locomotives
Standard gauge locomotives of the United States